Procotes is a monotypic moth genus in the Zygaenidae family described by Arthur Gardiner Butler in 1876. Its single species, Procotes diminuta, described by Francis Walker in 1854, is found in Sri Lanka.

References

Moths described in 1854
Monotypic moth genera